The Hong Kong Film Award for Best Cinematography is an annual Hong Kong industry award presented to a cinematographer or a group of cinematographers for the best achievement in cinematography.

History
The award was established at the 2nd Hong Kong Film Awards (1983) and the first winner in this category was Arthur Wong for his contribution in the cinematography of He Lives by Night. The most recent recipient of the award was also Arthur Wong, he was honoured at the 28th Hong Kong Film Awards (2009), for the film Painted Skin. Arthur Wong is holding the record for most awards in this category is Jackie Chan Stunt Team with 8 times.

Winners and nominees

See also 
 Hong Kong Film Award
 Hong Kong Film Award for Best Actor
 Hong Kong Film Award for Best Actress
 Hong Kong Film Award for Best Supporting Actor
 Hong Kong Film Award for Best Supporting Actress
 Hong Kong Film Award for Best Action Choreography
 Hong Kong Film Award for Best Director
 Hong Kong Film Award for Best Film
 Hong Kong Film Award for Best New Performer

References

External links
 Hong Kong Film Awards Official Site

Hong Kong Film Awards
Awards established in 1983